The 1983 Rhode Island Rams football team was an American football team that represented the University of Rhode Island in the Yankee Conference during the 1983 NCAA Division I-AA football season. In their eighth season under head coach Bob Griffin, the Rams compiled a 6–4 record (2–3 against conference opponents) and tied for fourth out of six teams in the conference.

Schedule

References

Rhode Island
Rhode Island Rams football seasons
1983 in sports in Rhode Island